Henrie is both a surname and a given name. Notable people with the name include:

Surname:
David Henrie (born 1989), American actor, television writer, and producer
Don Henrie, American television personality
Gervais Henrie, Seychellois politician
Mark C. Henrie, American writer and journal editor
Paul Blaine Henrie (1932–1999), American painter and illustrator

Given name:
Henrie Mutuku (born 1978), Kenyan singer

See also
Henry (disambiguation)